Sharwin II (Persian: شروین), was the tenth ruler of the Bavand dynasty from 896 to 930. 

In 896, Sharwin's father, Rustam I, was tortured to death by Rafi ibn Harthama, who then divided Rustam's domains in Tabaristan with Zaydid Muhammad ibn Zayd. Sharwin thus succeeded Rustam I as the head of the Bavand family. In 900, Sharwin, along with the Karenid ruler Shahriyar ibn Baduspan, aided the Samanids in conquering Tabaristan. After the successful Samanid conquest, Sharwin's domains were restored to him. However, in 914, Hasan al-Utrush managed to re-establish Zaydid control over Tabaristan, and forced Sharwin accept the Zaydids as his overlord and pay tribute to them. Sharwin seems to have later aided Makan ibn Kaki in his campaign to conquer Khorasan from the Samanids in 930, where Sharwin shortly died, and was succeeded by his son Shahriyar II. Vushmgir, who would become the overlord of Tabaristan in 935, married Sharwin's daughter after the latter's death.

References

Sources
 
 
 

Bavand dynasty
9th-century monarchs in Asia
10th-century monarchs in Asia
9th-century Iranian people
10th-century Iranian people
930 deaths
Year of birth unknown